George Shelley was a sailor, soldier, engineer and adventurer from New Zealand. From a young age George Shelley became a sailor. In the second World War he fought against Rommel. After Rommel's defeat, he came on a visit to Mandatory Palestine, at which time he had reached the rank of lieutenant. After that was sent to fight in the Far East and was taken hostage by the Japanese. He tried to escape using a glider, but the escape failed and he got injured. He was released two weeks later at the end of the war. 
After the war he went to the United Kingdom and became an engineer. Shelley was not Jewish and for an unknown reason he travelled in January 1948 to Mandatory Palestine to join the Jewish war efforts. He joined the Negev Brigade of the Palmach as a sapper. In July 1948 he participated in the Operation An-Far against Egypt but was taken hostage. He suffered severe maltreatment at the hands of the Egyptians and was transferred to the Abbassia camp. Shelley managed to escape the camp and reached back Israel. 
His report on the mistreatment of the Israeli POW's in Egypt received prominence and as a result the treatment of those prisoners improved.

References

New Zealand military personnel